The Georgia state Senate is the upper house of the Georgia General Assembly, in the U.S. state of Georgia.

Legal provisions
The Georgia State Senate is the upper house of the Georgia General Assembly, with the lower house being the Georgia House of Representatives. Both bodies are constitutionally required to convene annually at the Georgia State Capitol in Atlanta. The General Assembly begins each yearly session on the second Monday in January. From that date of convention, sessions last for 40 legislative days.

The General Assembly may call for special sessions by a three-fifths vote of the members in each chamber. Special sessions in Georgia may span a maximum of 40 days.

Membership requirements
The Georgia State Senate consists of 56 members, each representing single-member legislative districts of equal size. State senators serve a term length of two years, with elections being held in even-numbered years. Senators officially assume their positions on the second Monday in January following their election.

To serve in the Senate, an individual must have attained the age of 25. The person must also be a qualified voter who has resided in the state of Georgia for at least two years. Unlike most states, senators are not required to have lived in their districts for a specific period of time before running.

Leadership
The formal President of the State Senate is the Lieutenant Governor of Georgia, who is elected statewide every four years. Other important figures in the Senate include the President pro tempore (who is elected by all members of the Senate), as well as the Majority Leader, Majority Whip, and Majority Caucus Chair (each of whom are elected by the majority of what is currently the Republican caucus).

The minority party is headed by the Minority Leader, who is elected by the minority party caucus.

Compensation
The current salary for state senators is $17,342. The Majority Leader and Minority Leader earn an additional $400 per month.

Officers
The presiding officer of the Senate is the president of the Senate. A president pro tempore, usually a high-ranking member of the majority party, acts as president in case of the temporary disability of the president. In case of the death, resignation, or permanent disability of the President or in the event of the succession of the president to the executive power, the President pro tempore becomes President. The Senate also has as an officer, the secretary of the Senate.

, the majority and minority leadership is as follows:

List of committees

 Administrative Affairs
 Agriculture and Consumer Affairs 
 Appropriations 
 Assignments
 Banking and Financial Institutions 
 Children and Families 
 Economic Development and Tourism 
 Education and Youth 
 Ethics 
 Finance
 Government Oversight
 Health and Human Services
 Higher Education 
 Insurance and Labor 
 Interstate Cooperation 

 Judiciary
 MARTOC
 Natural Resources and the Environment 
 Public Safety
 Reapportionment and Redistricting 
 Regulated Industries and Utilities
 Retirement 
 Rules 
 Science and Technology 
 Special Judiciary
 State and Local Governmental Operations 
 State Institutions and Property
 Transportation 
 Urban Affairs 
 Veterans, Military, and Homeland Security

Composition

According to the state constitution of 1983, this body is to be composed of no more than 56 members elected for two-year terms. Current state law provides for 56 members. Elections are held the first Tuesday after the first Monday in November in even-numbered years.

Senators must be at least 25 years old, a citizen of the United States, and a resident of Georgia for two years and their senatorial district for one year (preceding the election). The highest position in the Senate is the President of the Senate, a position currently held by Lieutenant Governor Burt Jones. The second-highest position is president pro tempore, currently held by Senator Butch Miller.

Past composition of the Senate

List of current senators
, the Georgia State Senate is composed of 56 members:

See also

 Georgia General Assembly
 Georgia House of Representatives
 155th Georgia General Assembly (2019–2021)
 154th Georgia General Assembly (2017–2018)
 153rd Georgia General Assembly (2015–2016)
 152nd Georgia General Assembly (2013–2014)
 151st Georgia General Assembly (2011–2012)
 150th Georgia General Assembly (2009–2010)
 149th Georgia General Assembly (2007–2008)
 148th Georgia General Assembly (2005–2006)
 147th Georgia General Assembly (2003–2004)
 146th Georgia General Assembly (2001–2002)
 145th Georgia General Assembly (1999–2000)
 144th Georgia General Assembly (1997–1998)
 143rd Georgia General Assembly (1995–1996)
 142nd Georgia General Assembly (1993–1994)
 140th Georgia General Assembly (1989–1990)
 139th Georgia General Assembly (1987–1988)
 138th Georgia General Assembly (1985–1986)
 137th Georgia General Assembly (1983–1984)
 136th Georgia General Assembly (1981–1982)
 135th Georgia General Assembly (1979–1980)
 134th Georgia General Assembly (1977–1978)
 Georgia Senate Democratic Caucus Official Website

References

External links 
 
 

Georgia General Assembly
State upper houses in the United States